Captain Ronald Olaf Hambro (1 December 1885 – 25 April 1961) was a British merchant banker.  He was chairman of Hambros Bank from 1932 to 1961.

Early life
Hambro was born on 1 December 1885. His paternal grandfather, Carl Joachim Hambro, was a Danish immigrant who founded the Hambros Bank in London in 1839. His paternal great-grandfather, Joseph Hambro, was a Danish banker and political advisor. His paternal great-great-grandfather, Calmer Hambro, was a Danish merchant and banker.

He was educated at Eton College. He attended Trinity College, Cambridge. During World War I, he served as a captain in the Coldstream Guards.

Career
Hambro started his career as Managing Director at the family business, Hambros Bank, in 1921. He served as its Chairman from 1932 to 1961.

He acquired Wiltons, a fine restaurant located at 55 Jermyn Street in London, during World War II.

He was appointed as the High Sheriff of Sussex in 1930.

Personal life

He married Winifred Emily Ridley-Smith on 17 February 1917. They resided at Kidbrooke Park in Forest Row, East Sussex and owned a house in Port Logan, Wigtownshire, Scotland. They had three children:
Jocelyn Olaf Hambro.
Simon Everard Hambro.
Anthony Martin Hambro.

Death
He died on 25 April 1961.

References

1885 births
1961 deaths
Alumni of Trinity College, Cambridge
Barons of Denmark
British people of Danish descent
British people of German-Jewish descent
Coldstream Guards officers
English bankers
English people of Danish descent
Olaf
People educated at Eton College
People from Forest Row
20th-century English businesspeople